Moca, MoCA, or MOCA may refer to:

Places
 Moca, Dominican Republic
 Moca, Equatorial Guinea
 Moca, Puerto Rico
 Moča, Slovakia

Science and technology
 Moca (genus), a genus of moths
 MOCA (protein), a protein involved in cell signaling
 MOCA, an application runtime environment and programming language by Blue Yonder
 Minimum obstacle clearance altitude
 Multimedia over Coax Alliance (MoCA), an industry group which develops specifications for home networking over residential coaxial cable
 4,4'-Methylenebis(2-chloroaniline), a compound used as a curing agent in polyurethane production
 Molybdenum cofactor cytidylyltransferase, an enzyme

Museums
 Museum of Contemporary Art (disambiguation), numerous museums around the world
 Museum of Comic Art, or MoCA, a museum in Noordwijk, The Netherlands, featuring original artwork by comic artists. 
 Museum of Chinese in America, a museum in New York City
 Matrix of Comparative Anthropogeny, formerly Museum of Comparative Anthropogeny, an online compilation of comparative information between humans and “great apes” at the Center for Academic Research and Training in Anthropogeny at the University of California, San Diego

Other uses
 Montreal Cognitive Assessment (MoCA), a test of cognitive function in humans
 Ministry of Civil Aviation (India)

See also
 MOCCA (disambiguation)
 Mocha (disambiguation)